Reinaldo Zavarce Peche (born June 8, 1988) is a Venezuelan actor and singer.  He was born in Caracas, Venezuela, and made his screen acting debut in the Venezuelan RCTV telenovelas “Mujer con Pantalones,” “Te Tengo en Salsa,” “Amantes,” and “Toda una dama.”  His film credits include the popular romantic comedy “Dia Naranja,” but he is perhaps best known for his starring role as Alex in the hit Nickelodeon Latin America /Sony Pictures Television teen drama series Isa TKM. and “Isa TK+”.

The show, commonly referred to as the “Latin American High School Musical,” became a phenomenon among teens across the Americas (US included due to its airing on MTV's Spanish language channel MTV Tr3s), and became a #1 hit in its demographic in over 23 countries its first season.  The Los Angeles Times deemed the fan frenzy surrounding the show and its cast members “Isa-mania,”
 and in 2008 Reinaldo was awarded “Actor of the Year” at Nickelodeon Brazil’s “Meus Premios Nick” Awards (and again in 2010 at the Kids Choice Awards Mexico).    That Zavarce’s real-life ex girlfriend was (and is) on- screen “Isa” love Maria Gabriela de Faría only added to the press and public frenzy around Reinaldo, and has kept them both on the covers of some of the biggest magazines across Latin America and Brazil.

He hosted the Nickelodeon Latin America and Brazil coverage of the 2012 US Nickelodeon Kids Choice Awards with Will Smith.   His KCA host duties were a performed in a mix of English, Spanish and Portuguese languages, he is fluent in all three.  Zavarce is managed (worldwide) by SCRIVEN TALENT (Los Angeles)  and repped internationally by William Morris Endeavor (Los Angeles).

He's starting to write his new feature film, "Destroying Nacho" motivated by real life events.

Music
Since becoming a household name via television, Peche has also evolved into a bona-fide music star.   After two top selling “Isa” records (#1 in Brazil, Mexico, Venezuela and Colombia, top 10 in Argentina), and a sold out “Isa” live tour, Reinaldo went on to create a new punk-pop side project, PANORAMA EXPRESS f/Reinaldo Zavarce “Peche”, which released its first EP, "Directo a Shanghai" on April 3, 2012.

Background
Reinaldo Zavarce Peche  was born in Caracas, Venezuela.  He shares his first name with his father, Reinaldo, and his  "Peche" with his mother, Laura Peche. He has two siblings, Andrea and Vicente.  Zavarce attended High School Central of Bachelors Technology Agricultural (CBTA) No. 264, in Hermosillo, Sonora, Mexico.

An avid sports fan and talented athlete, Reinaldo played soccer on the professional youth team Venezuelan  Venezuelan Deportivo Italia at the FIFA U-20 World Cup and won a scholarship to the Illinois Institute of Technology in Chicago to study administration and to play soccer.   Zavarce returned to Venezuela after an injury, and resumed his studies at the Universidad Metropolitana in Caracas.

He has also been a semi-professional, previously sponsored, Paintball player.

Career
In 2004, Zavarce attended a casting call for Venezuela television and subsequently participated in several popular telenovelas: Mujer con pantalones (Women Wearing Pants), Te tengo en salsa (I have you in Salsa), and Amante (Lovers).

In 2007 he participated (along with Maria Gabriela de Faria) on the soap opera Toda una dama (A Lady) for RCTV International playing the role of the son of a politician.

In 2008 he joined the cast of the Nickelodeon Latin America teen drama Isa TKM.  The musical telenovela was written by Mariela Romero  and debuted in several Latin American in September and October 2008 and on MTV Tr3́s in June 2009.  The series has given Zavarce recognition in several Latin American countries for his role as "Alex".  The series is positively compared to the High School Musical film series, and Band.com.br writes "The teen soap produced by Sony Pictures Television for Nickelodeon Latin America is a phenomenon among pre-teens across the Americas, all because of the adventures of Alex and Isabella (Reinaldo "Peche" Zavarce) who, together with Linda (Micaela Castelotti) Cristina (Milena Torres) and Rey (Willy Martin), show much color, music, dance and humor."

Also in 2008, he began work in Día naranja (Orange Day), directed by Venezuelan Alejandra Szeplaki.  Zavarce starred as "Victor", a DJ affected by the probable pregnancy of his girlfriend.  The film premiered in Venezuela on October 9, 2009.

The second in the Isa TKM series, Isa TK+, premiered in January 2009.

Filmography

Film

Television roles

Awards and nominations
 2008   "Actor of the Year"   Nickelodeon Brazi Meus Premios Nick Awards (and again in
 2010   "Actor of the Year"   Nickelodeon Kids Choice Awards Mexico

References

External links
 
 Reinaldo Zavarce at the Internet Movie Database

1988 births
Living people
Male actors from Caracas
Singers from Caracas
Venezuelan male models
Venezuelan male television actors
21st-century Venezuelan male singers